A naval station was a geographic command responsible for conducting all naval operations within its defined area. It may consist of flotillas, or squadrons, or individual ships under command. 

The British Royal Navy for command purposes was separated into a number of stations or fleets, each normally under an admiral.

The United States Department of the Navy's General Order No 135 issued in 1911 as a formal guide to Naval Terms described a Naval Station as "any establishment for building, manufacturing, docking, repair, supply, or training under control of the Navy. It may also include several establishments". A Naval Base by contrast was "a point from which naval operations may be conducted"

Notes

Military terminology